Moments Like This is a 1993 studio album by Peggy Lee, the last album that Lee recorded.

Track listing 
 "I Don't Know Enough About You" (Dave Barbour, Peggy Lee) – 2:46
 "I'm in Love Again" (Cy Coleman, Lee, Bill Schluger) – 4:33
 "Why Don't You Do Right?" (Kansas Joe McCoy) – 3:36
 "Remind Me" (Dorothy Fields, Jerome Kern) – 4:07
 "Moments Like This" (Burton Lane, Frank Loesser) – 2:35
 "Love Is Here to Stay" (George Gershwin, Ira Gershwin) – 4:21
 "Don't Ever Leave Me" (Oscar Hammerstein II, Kern) – 3:20
 "Mañana (Is Soon Enough for Me)" (Barbour, Lee) – 3:03
 "The Folks Who Live On the Hill" (Hammerstein, Kern) – 3:53
 "'S Wonderful" (G. Gershwin, I. Gershwin) – 3:22
 "Amazing" (Norman Gimbel, Emil Stern) – 3:08
 "Do I Love You?" (Cole Porter) – 3:45
 "You're My Thrill" (Sidney Clare, Jay Gorney) – 4:13
 "Always True to You in My Fashion" (Porter) – 2:56
 "Then Was Then" (Cy Coleman, Lee) – 4:08

References 

1993 albums
Chesky Records albums
Peggy Lee albums